The 1992 Cal State Northridge  Matadors football team represented California State University, Northridge as a member of the Western Football Conference (WFC) during the 1992 NCAA Division II football season. Led by seventh-year head coach Bob Burt, Cal State Northridge compiled an overall record of 5–5 with a mark of 3–2 in conference play, tying for second place in the WFC. The team was outscored by its opponents 224 to 161 for the season. The Matadors played home games at North Campus Stadium in Northridge, California.

The WFC folded after 1992, in part because of a new NCAA rule that prohibited member institutions who competed at the NCAA Division I level in other sports to compete at the NCAA Division II level in football. Four WFC members (Cal State Northridge, Sacramento State, Cal Poly, and Southern Utah) joined UC Davis as charter members of the NCAA Division I American West Conference in 1993.

Schedule

References

Cal State Northridge
Cal State Northridge Matadors football seasons
Cal State Northridge Matadors football